Giancarlo De Carlo (12 December 1919 − 4 June 2005) was an Italian architect.

Biography 

Giancarlo De Carlo was born in Genoa, Liguria, in 1919. In 1939, he enrolled at the Milan Polytechnic, where he graduated in engineering in 1943. During the Second World War (WWII), he was enlisted as a naval officer. Following the armistice of 8 September 1943, he went into hiding, taking part in the Italian Resistance with the Movement of Proletarian Unity in which other Milanese architects such as Franco Albini also participated. Later, De Carlo organized an anarchist-libertarian partisan group in Milan (the Matteotti Brigades), together with Giuseppe Pagano.

At the end of the war, De Carlo publicized Le Corbusier in Milan and joined the anarchist movement, eventually participating in the first congress of the International of Anarchist Federations in Carrara. In this period, he began his collaboration with the anarchist magazine Volontà, in which he tried to launch new social ideas for reconstruction and the incessant need for social housing.

In 1948, De Carlo resumed his studies at the Istituto Universitario di Architettura di Venezia (Università Iuav di Venezia) where he received his degree in architecture on 1 August of the following year (1949). In 1950, he opened his own studio in Milan. In 1951, he organized an exhibition on spontaneous architecture and, three years later, presented three short films written with Elio Vittorini in which he denounced the drift towards a modern metropolis run by bureaucrats and technicians, in whom interest in man is not a priority, and urged the spectator to act personally.

In 1955, De Carlo obtained a professorship in urban planning, which he maintained until 1983, coming into contact, and often clashing, with the major names in Italian architecture and urbanism such as Giuseppe Samonà, Carlo Scarpa, Bruno Zevi and Paolo Portoghesi. Between 1952 and 1960, De Carlo was part of the new generation invited to participate in the Congrès Internationaux d'Architecture Moderne (CIAM).

In 1956, as an Italian member of the CIAM, De Carlo presented his own project for a housing complex in Matera in which all the principles of le Corbusier are ignored at the expense of specific attention to the geographical, social and climatic context of the region. It is a strong break with the old generation of architects and the myth of a unique international architectural model. Thus, in the 1956 congress, the end of the CIAM was marked with the start of Team 10, which brought together the new generation of architects (including De Carlo, Alison and Peter Smithson, Aldo van Eyck, and Jacob Bakema) to conceive a new type of architecture, one which was better suited to local social and environmental conditions and where man "is not reduced to an abstract figure".

In 1964, De Carlo was in charge of the first General Town Plan of the city of Urbino. From 1965 onward, he was in charge of designing the campus and facilities of the new University of Urbino. In the design, the campus is designed to merge with the existing hilly landscape. It was this project that saw him busy for many years of his life, and that gave him his first real international recognition. During the 1968 movement in Italy, he sought a constructive dialogue with his students and published a series of texts and essays in which he theorized a more democratic and open "participatory architecture".

Libertarian socialism was the underlying force for all of his planning and design. De Carlo saw architecture as a consensus-based activity: his designs were generated as an expression of the forces that operate in a given context, including human, physical, cultural, and historical forces. His ideas linked the CIAM ideals with the late twentieth century reality.

Although his political beliefs have limited his portfolio of buildings, his ideas remained. From 1970 onward, he began building houses for workers in Terni, together with the workers and their families themselves. This was the first example of a participatory architecture in Italy, which turned out to be a success, being repeated with different results and procedures; in 1972 for the Rimini City Plan, and in 1979 for the recovery of Mazzorbo Island in Venice.

In 1976, De Carlo founded the ILAUD (International Laboratory of Architecture & Urban Design), based on the principles of Team X, which for 27 years took place every summer in Italy, in order to carry out continuous research in the evolution of architecture. In 1978, he founded and directed the magazine "Space and Society" which kept the network created by Team X active and guaranteed an alternative and independent voice in the European architectural sphere for the next 20 years.

In Siena, De Carlo was in charge of a project for the new suburb of San Miniato which he criticized for its practical implementation (with its execution completed almost entirely by the municipality of Siena) and from which he dissociated himself later.

De Carlo died in Milan in 2005.

Honors and awards
 The Wolf Prize in Arts in 1988.
 The RIBA Royal Gold Medal in 1993.

Several times he was invited to universities around the world for conferences and meetings, receiving numerous awards and recognitions. De Carlo received an Honorary Doctorate from Heriot-Watt University in 1995.

Projects

Commencing in the 1950s 

 1950–1951, Public Housing, Sesto San Giovanni, Milan.
 1951–1953, Public Housing, Baveno.
 1952–1960, Palazzo Bonaventura (Redevelopment), Seat of the University of Urbino.
 1956–1957, Housing and Shops, Matera.
 1958–1964, Masterplan, Urbino.

Commencing in the 1960s 

 1961–1965, Municipal Masterplan for Milan (with Alessandro Tutino and Silvano Tintori).
 1961–1963, Summer Camp, Riccione.
 1962–1965, Collegio del Colle Student Accommodation, Urbino.
 1963, Restoration of retirement housing (Palazzo degli Anziani), Urbino.
 1966–1968, Faculty of Law, Urbino.
 1967–1969, La Pineta Quarter, Urbino.
 1967–1969, Mirano Hospital, Metropolitan City of Venice
 1968, Ca' Romanino (Casa Sichirollo), Urbino.
 1968–1976, Faculty of Education, Urbino.
 1969, Italian Pavilion, Osaka, Japan.
 1969–1972, Redevelopment, Piazza del Mercatale, Urbino.

Commencing in the 1970s 

 1970–1975, Villaggio Matteotti Housing Development, Terni.
 1970–1972, Plan for the center of Rimini and San Giuliano.
 1971–1975, Restoration of Francesco di Giorgio's Staircase, Urbino.
 1973–1983, Student Accommodation, Urbino.
 1972–1985, Faculty of Engineering, University of Pavia.
 1977–1982, Restoration of the theatre, Teatro Sanzio, Urbino.
 1977–1979, Elementary and Middle School, Buia/Osoppo, Udine.
 1979, Plans for the Redevelopment of the Historic Center of Palermo.
 1979–1985, Housing, Mazzorbo, Venice.

Commencing in the 1980s 

 1980–1981, Restoration of the historic church and buildings of Cascina San Lazzaro, Pavia.
 1980–1981, Competition entry for Piazzale delle Pace, Parma.
 1981–1983, Restoration of the Prè area of Genoa.
 1983, New seat for the Scuola del Libro High School, Urbino
 1982–2001, Faculty of Medicine and Biology, University of Siena.
 1983–1987, Restoration of the historic boatshed, Cervia
 1986–2005, Carlo Cattaneo High School, San Miniato, Province of Pisa.
 1986–1999, Restoration of Palazzo Battiferri, Urbino.
 1986–2004, Restoration and Redevelopment of the Monastery of San Nicolò l'Arena, Catania.
 ?-1989, Masterplan, historic centre of Lastra a Signa.
 1989–2005, Sports Complex, Mazzorbo, Venice.
 1989–1994, New Masterplan, Urbino.

Commencing in the 1990s 

 1992–2005, New Palace of Justice, Pesaro.
 1993–1999, Restoration and redevelopment of the hamlet, Colletta di Castelbianco, Savona.
 1994–2000, Entrance gates to the Republic of San Marino.
 1995–2002, Café/Bathing Establishment, Nuovo Blue Moon, Lido, Venice.
 1996, Plans for ferry dock, Thessaloniki, Greece.
 1997–2001, Restoration of Castello di Montefiore, Recanati.
 1997–1998, University campus, via Roccaromana, Catania.

Commencing in the 2000s 

 2000–2001, Competition entry for Ponte Parodi, Genoa.
 2003, Competition entry for the Porta Nuova Gardens, Milan.
 2003–2006, Housing, Wadi Abou Jmeel, Beirut, Lebanon.
 2003–2005, Children's center, Ravenna.

Further reading
 Benedict Zucchi (1992) Giancarlo De Carlo, Oxford: Butterworth Architecture 
 John McKean 'Il Magistero: De Carlo's dialogue with historical forms', Places (California/Cambridge Mass) Vol 16, No 1, Fall 2003 
 John McKean, Giancarlo De Carlo, Layered Places, Stuttgart and Paris (2004), published in English by Menges (Stuttgart) and in French by Centre Pompidou as "Giancarlo De Carlo: Des Lieux, Des Hommes". 
 John McKean, “Giancarlo De Carlo et l’experience politique de la participation”, in 'La Modernite Critique, autour du CIAM 9, d’Aix-en-Provence – 1953', ed. Bonillo, Massu & Pinson, Marseille: editions Imberton, 2006
 Alberto Franchini (2020) Il Villaggio Matteotti a Terni. Giancarlo De Carlo e l'abitare collettivo, Roma: L'Erma di Bretschneider

References

External links

  Faculty of Architecture, Università di Roma3. Students workshop and exhibition "Giancarlo De Carlo, Partigiano dell'Architettura" (Italian)
 ILAUD.ORG

1919 births
2005 deaths
Architects from Genoa
20th-century Italian architects
Italian libertarians
Modernist architects
Structuralists
Recipients of the Royal Gold Medal
Wolf Prize in Arts laureates